There are 70 primary Interstate Highways in the Interstate Highway System, a network of freeways in the United States. They are assigned one- or two-digit route numbers, whereas their associated auxiliary Interstate Highways receive three-digit route numbers. Typically, odd-numbered Interstates run south-north, with lower numbers in the west and higher numbers in the east; even-numbered Interstates run west-east, with lower numbers in the south and higher numbers in the north. Highways whose route numbers are divisible by 5 usually represent major coast-to-coast or border-to-border routes (ex. I-10 travels from Santa Monica, California, to Jacksonville, Florida, traveling from the Pacific to Atlantic oceans). Additionally, auxiliary highways have their numbering system where a different number prefixes the number of its parent highway.

Five route numbers are duplicated in the system, though the corresponding highways are separated by state lines which prevent confusion. The main list that discusses the primary Interstate Highways in the contiguous United States is followed by sections regarding Alaska, Hawaii, and Puerto Rico.

Contiguous United States
There are 70 primary Interstate Highways listed below.

Other jurisdictions
In addition to the 48 contiguous states, Interstate Highways are found in Hawaii, Alaska, and Puerto Rico.  The Federal Highway Administration funds four routes in Alaska and three routes in Puerto Rico under the same program as the rest of the Interstate Highway System. However, these routes are not required to meet the same standards as the mainland routes:

Hawaii

The Interstate Highways on the island of Oahu, Hawaii are signed with the standard Interstate Highway shield, with the letter "H-" prefixed before the number. They are fully controlled-access routes built to the same standards as the mainland Interstate Highways.

Alaska

Alaska's Interstate Highways are unsigned as such, although they all have state highway numbers that do not match the Interstate Highway numbers.

Puerto Rico

Like Alaska, Puerto Rico signs its Interstate Highways as territorial routes, as the numbers do not match their official Interstate Highway designations. Many of the territory's routes are freeway-standard toll roads.

See also

 List of United States Numbered Highways

References

External links

 Alaska Roads - Interstate ends photos
 Puerto Rico road photos
 The Dwight D. Eisenhower National System of Interstate and Defense Highways Route Log and Finder List
 3-digit Interstate Highways

Interstate